Stefan Hermann Haag OBE (26 March 192525 December 1986) was an Austrian-Australian singer; opera, theatre and television director and producer; lighting and set designer; and arts administrator.  He was described as a “complete man of the theatre”.

Biography

Stefan Haag was born in Vienna.  As a child he sang with the Vienna Boys Choir and Vienna Mozart Boys Choir.  The choir found itself stranded in Australia at the outbreak of World War II in 1939, and he decided to stay.  He sang baritone roles with the National Opera Theatre (possibly under the name Louis Waters) and later became a producer for the National Theatre Movement (1948–50).  In 1950 he returned to Europe on a Victorian government scholarship to study arts production.

In 1956 Stefan Haag became production director of the newly formed Elizabethan Theatre Trust Opera Company, the forerunner of Opera Australia.  In 1957 he directed its production of Offenbach’s The Tales of Hoffmann.  From 1960 to 1962 he was opera company's artistic director.  From 1963 to 1969 he was Executive Director of the Elizabethan Theatre Trust.

He later worked as a television and theatre producer and was artistic director of several arts festivals.  He promoted successful productions such as Hair and Jesus Christ Superstar and promoted Aboriginal theatre.  He was also a director of the New Zealand Drama Council summer school.

In the 1968 Queen's Birthday Honours, Stefan Haag was appointed an Officer of the Order of the British Empire for his development of the performing arts.

External links 
 Australian Dictionary of Biography
 National Library of Australia
 Sydney Journal, March 2008
 Encyclopedia of New Zealand, 1966
 The Dictionary of Performing Arts in Australia

References

1925 births
1986 deaths
20th-century Australian male opera singers
Austrian emigrants to Australia
Naturalised citizens of Australia
Australian Officers of the Order of the British Empire
Opera in Australia
Opera managers
Australian arts administrators
Musicians from Vienna